Nathaniel 'James' Fraser (born 16 April 1913, date of death unknown) was a Scottish footballer who played for Blackburn Rovers, Wrexham, Dumbarton and Stenhousemuir.

References

1913 births
Year of death missing
Scottish footballers
Dumbarton F.C. players
Wrexham A.F.C. players
Blackburn Rovers F.C. players
Stenhousemuir F.C. players
Scottish Football League players
English Football League players
Association football inside forwards